The 12th Sarasaviya Awards festival (Sinhala: 12වැනි සරසවිය සම්මාන උලෙළ), presented by the Associated Newspapers of Ceylon Limited, was held to honor the best films of 1983 Sinhala cinema on July 21, 1984, at the Bandaranaike Memorial International Conference Hall, Colombo 07, Sri Lanka. Honorable Speaker of the Parliament E. L. Senanayake was the chief guest at the awards night.

The film Dadayama won the most awards with seven including Best Film.

Awards

References

Sarasaviya Awards
Sarasaviya